In multivariable calculus, the implicit function theorem is a tool that allows relations to be converted to functions of several real variables. It does so by representing the relation as the graph of a function. There may not be a single function whose graph can represent the entire relation, but there may be such a function on a restriction of the domain of the relation. The implicit function theorem gives a sufficient condition to ensure that there is such a function.

As these functions can generally not be expressed in closed form, they are implicitly defined by the equations, and this motivated the name of the theorem.

In other words, under a mild condition on the partial derivatives, the set of zeros of a system of equations is locally the graph of a function.

History 
Augustin-Louis Cauchy (1789–1857) is credited with the first rigorous form of the implicit function theorem. Ulisse Dini (1845–1918) generalized the real-variable version of the implicit function theorem to the context of functions of any number of real variables.

First example 

If we define the function , then the equation  cuts out the unit circle as the level set .

However, it is possible to represent part of the circle as the graph of a function of one variable. Similarly, if , then the graph of  gives the lower half of the circle.

The purpose of the implicit function theorem is to tell us that functions like  and  almost always exist, even in situations where we cannot write down explicit formulas.

Definitions 
Let  be a continuously differentiable function.

As noted above, this may not always be possible. We will therefore fix a point  which satisfies , and we will ask for a  that works near the point . In symbols,

Writing all the hypotheses together gives the following statement.

Statement of the theorem 
Let  be a continuously differentiable function, and let  have coordinates . If the Jacobian matrix (this is the right-hand panel of the Jacobian matrix shown in the previous section):

is invertible, then there exists an open set  containing  such that there exists a unique continuously differentiable function  such that  and  Moreover, denoting the left-hand panel of the Jacobian matrix shown in the previous section as:

Higher derivatives
In the analytic case, this is called the analytic implicit function theorem.

Proof for 2D case 
Suppose  is a continuously differentiable function defining a curve . Let  be a point on the curve. The statement of the theorem above can be rewritten for this simple case as follows:

Proof. Since F is differentiable we write the differential of F through partial derivatives:

Therefore we have a first-order ordinary differential equation:

Now we are looking for a solution to this ODE in an open interval around the point  for which, at every point in it, . Since F is continuously differentiable and from the assumption we have

From this we know that  is continuous and bounded on both ends. From here we know that  is Lipschitz continuous in both x and y. Therefore, by Cauchy-Lipschitz theorem, there exists unique y(x) that is the solution to the given ODE with the initial conditions. Q.E.D.

The circle example 
Let us go back to the example of the unit circle. The matrix of partial derivatives is just a 1 × 2 matrix, given by

By the implicit function theorem we see that we can locally write the circle in the form  for all points where . For  we run into trouble, as noted before.

The implicit derivative of y with respect to x, and that of x with respect to y, can be found by totally differentiating the implicit function  and equating to 0:

giving

and

Application: change of coordinates 
Suppose we have an -dimensional space, parametrised by a set of coordinates . We can introduce a new coordinate system  by supplying m functions  each being continuously differentiable. These functions allow us to calculate the new coordinates  of a point, given the point's old coordinates  using . One might want to verify if the opposite is possible: given coordinates , can we 'go back' and calculate the same point's original coordinates ? The implicit function theorem will provide an answer to this question. The (new and old) coordinates  are related by f = 0, with

Now the Jacobian matrix of f at a certain point (a, b) [ where  ] is given by

(In the above, these blocks were denoted by X and Y. As it happens, in this particular application of the theorem, neither matrix depends on a.) The implicit function theorem now states that we can locally express  as a function of  if J is invertible. Demanding J is invertible is equivalent to det J ≠ 0, thus we see that we can go back from the primed to the unprimed coordinates if the determinant of the Jacobian J is non-zero. This statement is also known as the inverse function theorem.

Example: polar coordinates 
As a simple application of the above, consider the plane, parametrised by polar coordinates . This makes it possible given any point  to find corresponding Cartesian coordinates . When can we go back and convert Cartesian into polar coordinates? By the previous example, it is sufficient to have , with

Since , conversion back to polar coordinates is possible if . So it remains to check the case . It is easy to see that in case , our coordinate transformation is not invertible: at the origin, the value of θ is not well-defined.

Generalizations

Banach space version 
Based on the inverse function theorem in Banach spaces, it is possible to extend the implicit function theorem to Banach space valued mappings.

Let X, Y, Z be Banach spaces. Let the mapping  be continuously Fréchet differentiable.

Implicit functions from non-differentiable functions 
Various forms of the implicit function theorem exist for the case when the function f is not differentiable. It is standard that local strict monotonicity suffices in one dimension. The following more general form was proven by Kumagai based on an observation by Jittorntrum.

Consider a continuous function  such that .
f(x, y) = 0 has a unique solution

where g is a continuous function from B0 into A0.

See also 
Inverse function theorem
Constant rank theorem: Both the implicit function theorem and the inverse function theorem can be seen as special cases of the constant rank theorem.

Notes

References

Further reading
 
 
 
 

Articles containing proofs
Mathematical identities
Theorems in calculus
Theorems in real analysis